Thomas Hyde Villiers (24 January 1801 – 3 December 1832) was a British politician from the Villiers family.

The second son of the Hon. George Villiers (third son of Thomas Villiers, 1st Earl of Clarendon), he was educated at St John's College, Cambridge. He served in the Colonial Office from 1822 to 1825, and was agent for Berbice and Newfoundland.

He was Member of Parliament for Hedon from 1826 to 1830, for Wootton Bassett in 1830, and for Bletchingley from 1831 to 1832. He held office as Secretary to the Board of Control from 1831 until 1832.

Early life
He was the second son of George Villiers (1759–1827), who married, on 17 April 1798, Theresa, only daughter of John Parker, 1st Baron Boringdon. George William Frederick Villiers, 4th Earl of Clarendon was their eldest son, Charles Pelham Villiers their third son, and Henry Montagu Villiers their fifth son.

Thomas Villiers was educated at home; he was then sent with his eldest brother to St. John's College, Cambridge. There he mixed with Charles Austin, Edward Strutt, John Romilly, Thomas Babington Macaulay, and others, most of them followers of Jeremy Bentham. In 1822 he graduated B.A., and in 1825 he proceeded M.A. On taking his degree in 1822 he entered the colonial office, where Sir Henry Taylor became early in 1824 his subordinate and then a close friend. The brothers lived during the earlier years of their lives with their parents in a part of Kent House in Knightsbridge, but from 1825 Thomas Hyde Villiers and Taylor shared a house in Suffolk Street.

Politician
Villiers joined in 1825 a debating club called "The Academics", where several of his college friends and John Stuart Mill discussed political and economic topics. A speech of his, aon colonisation, attracted the attention of the chancellor of the exchequer. Not long afterwards Villiers gave up government service to embark on politics. His chief source of income at that point was from the agencies for Berbice and Newfoundland.

At the general election in June 1826 Villiers was returned to parliament for the borough of Hedon in Yorkshire, and sat for it until the dissolution in 1830. In 1830 and 1831 he sat respectively for Wootton Bassett (a family borough) and Bletchingley, and voted for the Reform Bill.

Between 1825 and 1828, Villiers and Sir Robert Wilmot-Horton wrote, under the pseudonym 'Vindex', articles to the Star newspaper, in which they refuted the objections that others had made to the analysis of slavery made by Thomas Moody, Kt., the Parliamentary Commissioner on West Indian Slavery, and defended the character of Moody.

Villiers travelled in Ireland in 1828, and set out his views in long letters to Taylor. A letter written by him in February 1829 was shown to Richard Lalor Sheil, who then brought about the suppression of the Catholic Association. He suggested in 1831 the formation of the commission that laid the foundation of the new poor law, and assisted in its preliminary inquiries. On 18 May 1831 he became Secretary to the Board of Control under Charles Grant. Later in the year (2 November 1831) Villiers and Taylor entered as students at Lincoln's Inn. On 22 August 1831 he made a long speech in the House of Commons on the Methuen treaty with Portugal. The committees on Indian affairs were organised by Villiers, with the assistance of Lord Althorp. The renewal of the charter to the East India Company at this time preoccupied him.

Family
Villiers and Charlotte Harte had two children: Rev. Charles Lawrence Villiers (1830 – 15 October 1893), Rector of Croft Parish in Yorkshire, and Gertrude Villiers (1 August 1834 – 2 July 1896), who in 1853 married Rev. William Frederick Bickmore.

Rev. Villiers married Florence Mary Tyssen Amhurst and had issue, including a daughter named Gertrude Mary Amelia Villiers (1861 – 30 Aug 1949) who in 1896 married Hon. Robert Grimston (18 April 1860 – 8 July 1927).

Death
At the time of his death Villiers was a candidate for the constituency of Penryn and Falmouth in Cornwall. After three months' suffering from an abscess in the head, he died on 3 December 1832 at Carclew, the seat of Sir Charles Lemon, near Penryn, where he was staying. A monument was placed to his memory in Mylor church.

References

External links 
 

Attribution

1801 births
1832 deaths
Members of the Parliament of the United Kingdom for English constituencies
UK MPs 1826–1830
UK MPs 1830–1831
UK MPs 1831–1832
Alumni of St John's College, Cambridge
Thomas Hyde